The following is a list of notable events and releases that happened in Scandinavian music in 2017. (Go to last year in Scandinavian music or next year in Scandinavian music.)

Events

January
 5 - Royal Danish Opera announces that its artistic director, Sven Müller, will leave his position in 2017, three years ahead of schedule. Müller is believed to have resigned because of financial cuts.
 18 – It is announced that Finland's Esa-Pekka Salonen has withdrawn as music director of the Ojai Music Festival  for 2018 because of his composition schedule, and will be replaced by Patricia Kopatchinskaja, ahead of her originally scheduled season in 2020.
 21 –  Hot Club de Norvège headline at the annual Djangofestival at Cosmopolite in Oslo, Norway.
 28
At the annual Uuden Musiikin Kilpailu, Norma John is selected to represent Finland in the Eurovision Song Contest.
At Norway's Spellemannprisen, Karpe Diem win the Best Album and Urban Music awards.

February
 4 – The Melodifestivalen 2017 kicks off with Semi-final 1 taking place in Gothenburg.
 25 - At the 47th edition of the Dansk Melodi Grand Prix, "Where I Am", performed by Anja Nissen, is selected as Denmark's entry for the Eurovision Song Contest.
 28 - At Sweden's Grammis Awards ceremony, Zara Larsson receives the Artist of the Year award and Kent win both the Album of the Year and Rock Album of the Year.

March
 2 - At the 2017 Icelandic Music Awards, Júníus Meyvant wins Best Pop Album of the Year for Floating Harmonies. Emmsjé Gauti is named Pop/Rock Performer of the Year, and wins in five categories overall.   
 9 - Esa-Pekka Salonen's Cello Concerto is premièred by Yo-Yo Ma and the Chicago Symphony Orchestra.
 11
The final of the 2017 Söngvakeppnin competition takes place in Iceland. Svala Björgvinsdóttir is selected as Iceland's representative in the Eurovision Song Contest 2017.
The final of Melodifestivalen 2017 takes place at the Friends Arena in Stockholm. Robin Bengtsson is selected as Sweden's representative in the Eurovision Song Contest 2017.
 28 – Under its new conductor Fabio Luisi, the Danish National Symphony Orchestra begins a tour of the United States.
 29 – The 2017 World Figure Skating Championships open in Finland, using the theme tune "Light Up the Ice", sung by Diandra.
 31 – The live final of X Factor (Denmark) is won by Morten Nørgaard.

April
 7 – The 44th Vossajazz starts in Voss, Norway, continuing until 9 April.
 12 – Inferno Metal Festival 2017 starts in Oslo, Norway, continuing until 15 April.

May
 8 – It is reported that Norwegian Eurovision jury member Per Sundnes has been replaced by Erland Bakke, after the Irish delegation complained about public comments that suggested he was prejudiced against their entry.
 9
Sweden's Sofi Jeannin is appointed chief conductor of the BBC Singers, the first woman to hold the post, effective in July 2018.
Finnish soprano Karita Mattila wins the Singer's award at the Royal Philharmonic Society (RPS) Music Awards 2017.
 13 – In the final of the Eurovision Song Contest 2017, Sweden finish in 5th place, Norway 10th and Denmark 20th, whilst Finland and Iceland fail to qualify for the final.
 15 - The Swedish Chamber Orchestra appoints Martin Fröst its principal conductor effective from 2019, with an initial contract of 3 seasons.  
 18 - Gita Kadambi is appointed general director of the Finnish National Opera and Ballet announces the appointment of as its next general director, effective January 2018.  Kadambi will stand down from her post as general manager of the Helsinki Philharmonic Orchestra.

June
 14 - Finnish band HIM open their Farewell Tour in Barcelona.
 24 - The Roskilde Festival opens in Roskilde, Denmark, running until 1 July.

July
 1 – FKP Scorpio announced the cancellation of the Bråvalla Festival, Sweden's biggest music festival, for 2018, because of the number of sex crimes reported at the festival.
 5 – The 18th Folk music festival of Siglufjordur opens in Siglufjordur, Iceland, running until 9 July.
 7 
 The Baltic Jazz festival opens in Dalsbruk, Finland, running until 9 July.
 The 38th Copenhagen Jazz Festival opens in Copenhagen, Denmark, running until 16 July.
 8 – The 52nd Pori Jazz Festival opens in Pori, Finland, running until 16 July.
 25 – Susanne Sundfør stars in a Prom concert at London's Royal Albert Hall, performing songs by Scott Walker.

August
 1 
 In Search of Stardust: Amazing Micro-Meteorites and Their Terrestrial Imposters, a book about cosmic dust in urban environments by Norwegian musician and polymath Jon Larsen, is published. 
 Finnish-born Tuomas Hiltunen takes over as general director of Fort Worth Opera.
 2 – Björk announces her still-unnamed new album on social media. In an interview with Dazed and Confused magazine, she states that “It’s about that search (for utopia) – and about being in love. Spending time with a person you enjoy is when the dream becomes real.”
 3 – The Notodden Blues Festival opens in Notodden, Norway, running until 6 August.
 8 – The 19th Øyafestivalen opens in Oslo, running until 13 August.
 20 – Sofi Jeannin makes her Proms debut, conducting the BBC Singers and City of London Sinfonia in a Reformation Day concert.
 31 – The 12th Punktfestivalen starts in Kristiansand, Norway, running until 2 September.

September
 6 – The Copenhagen World Music Festival opens, running until 10 September.
 8 – Sebastian Fagerlund’s new opera, Höstsonaten (Autumn Sonata) is premièred by Finnish National Opera.
 11 – Our Festival (Meidän Festivaali in Finnish) starts by Lake Tuusula, Finland, running until September 17.

October
 5 – Icelandic band Of Monsters and Men announce that they have become the first Icelandic band to achieve 1 billion Spotify Plays.
 6 – The 34th Stockholm Jazz Festival opens in Stockholm, running until 15 October.
 15 – Svitlana Azarova's opera Momo and the Time Thieves, commissioned by the Royal Danish Opera, Copenhagen, receives its world première. It is based on the children's book Momo by Michael Ende.
 19 – The 34th DølaJazz festival opens in Lillehammer, Norway, running until 22 October.
 22 – Finnish band Brother Firetribe scheduled to appear at the Rockingham Festival in the UK.
 25 – The 49th Umeå Jazz Festival opens in Umeå, Sweden, running until 29 October.

November
 1 – The Iceland Airwaves festival opens in Reykjavík, running until 5 November.
 24 – Björk releases her ninth album Utopia.

Albums released

January

February

March

April

May

June

July

August

September

October

November

December

Eurovision Song Contest
 Denmark in the Eurovision Song Contest 2017
 Finland in the Eurovision Song Contest 2017
 Iceland in the Eurovision Song Contest 2017
 Norway in the Eurovision Song Contest 2017
 Sweden in the Eurovision Song Contest 2017

Classical works
Teitur Lassen - Chinese Whispers (Hviskeleg) for guitar quartet
Frederik Magle - The Fairest of Roses - fanfare for two trumpets and organ

Film scores and incidental music
Vladislav Delay and Jon Ekstrand - Borg vs McEnroe

Deaths
 18 January - Ståle Wikshåland, 63, Norwegian musicologist (blood clot)
 7 February - Svend Asmussen, 100, Danish jazz violinist
 14 February - Tony Särkkä, 45, Swedish musician (Abruptum, Ophthalamia)
 22 February – Dag Østerberg, 78, Norwegian sociologist and musicologist
 27 February - Jórunn Viðar, 98, Icelandic pianist and composer
 6 March - Lars Diedricson, 55, Swedish singer (Snowstorm) and songwriter ("Take Me to Your Heaven"), winner of the Eurovision Song Contest 1999
 9 March - Barbara Helsingius, 79, Finnish singer, poet and Olympic fencer 
 22 March - Sven-Erik Magnusson, 74, Swedish musician (Sven-Ingvars)
 9 April – Knut Borge, 67, Norwegian music journalist and entertainer
 12 April - Mika Vainio, 53, Finnish electronic and experimental musician (Pan Sonic)
 1 May - Erkki Kurenniemi, 75, Finnish musician
 4 May - Katy Bødtger, 84, Danish singer
 7 June - Jan Høiland, 78, Norwegian singer
 7 July - Egil Monn-Iversen, 89, Norwegian composer and pianist
 13 July - Egil Kapstad, 76, Norwegian jazz pianist, arranger and composer
 25 September - Folke Rabe, 81, Swedish composer
 7 October - Jan Arvid Johansen, 70, Norwegian musician
 17 October - Ingvar Lidholm, 96, Swedish composer
 20 October - Boris Lindqvist, 76, Swedish rock singer (death announced on this date)
 22 October
Atle Hammer, 85, Norwegian jazz musician
Emu Lehtinen, 70, Finnish record dealer (leukemia)
 7 November - Pentti Glan, 71, Finnish-Canadian drummer (Alice Cooper, Lou Reed)
 21 December - Halvard Kausland, 72, Norwegian jazz guitarist

References

Scandinavian
Scandinavian culture